Gagea olgae is an Asian  species of plants in the lily family. It is native to Iran, Pakistan, Afghanistan, Kyrgyzstan, Tajikistan, Uzbekistan, Kazakhstan, and Xinjiang.

Gagea olgae is a bulb-forming perennial up to 6 cm tall. Flowers look yellow from the front, dark purple from the rear.

The species is named for plant collector Olga Fedschenko.

References

olgae
Flora of Asia
Plants described in 1875